Ayapel is a town and municipality located in the Córdoba Department, northern Colombia.

Ayapel is a Colombian municipality located in the far eastern department of Cordoba and bathed by the waters of San Jorge and Ayapel swamp.
Bounded on the north by San Marcos, San Benito Abad and Majagual, on the east by Guaranda and Achi, on the west by Buenavista and Montelibano, Pueblo Nuevo and south to the department of Antioquia.

References

 Gobernacion de Cordoba - Ayapel
 Ayapel official website

Córdoba